Below are the squads for the 2013 EAFF East Asian Cup tournament, held in Korea Republic. There were 23 players in each squad, including 3 goalkeepers.

Head coach:  Holger Osieck

Head coach:  Fu Bo (caretaker)

|-
! colspan="9" style="background:#b0d3fb; text-align:left;"|
|- style="background:#dfedfd;"

Manager:  Alberto Zaccheroni

Manager:  Hong Myung-bo

Player statistics
Player representation by club

Player representation by club league

Average age of squads

Players with most international appearance

Players with most international goals

Notes

References

External links
 Official website of East Asian Football Championship 2013 Final Competition by EAFF

EAFF E-1 Football Championship squads